Dillon is an unincorporated community in the boreal forest of northern Saskatchewan, Canada. It is located on the western shore of Peter Pond Lake at the mouth of the Dillon River. The community is the administrative headquarters of the Buffalo River Dene Nation and is accessed by Highway 925 from Highway 155.

History 

The North West Company had a post near Dillon in 1790. It was called Lac des Boeufs Post (Buffalo Lake Post). The Hudson's Bay Company had a post nearby in 1791.

In 1819–1820 Sir John Franklin noted the position of the North West Company Post on Buffalo Lake (Peter Pond Lake) where Buffalo River (Dillon River) is located. (see map)

The first post office opened under the name of Buffalo River in 1926 and closed in 1929. In 1954 the post office was re-opened under the name of Dillon.

Name changes 
In 1932 the name of the community was officially changed from Buffalo River to Dillon, the name of the river was changed from Buffalo River to Dillon River and Buffalo Lake was renamed Peter Pond Lake. A lake on the Dillon River just west of Vermette Lake also received its official name of Dillon Lake in 1932.

The source of the Dillon River is in Alberta east of Lake Winefred near co-ordinates .

References 

Dene communities
Unincorporated communities in Saskatchewan